Breakneck Hill is a mountain in the Ridge and Valley region of the Appalachian Mountains, located in Allegany County, Maryland.

References 

 Maryland Geological survey

Landforms of Allegany County, Maryland
Mountains of Maryland